Jamie Clarke is a Gaelic footballer. He plays for Crossmaglen and the Armagh county team.

Career 
He had stints in Melbourne and New York. He played for Cartwheel United in the Carnbane (Newry & Mourne) Football League, and then for New York Shamrocks. 

When he turned 33, he played with Newry City A.F.C. He switched codes to do it. He still at it playing with Cross.

He played for Armagh until 2020 making his last appearance for the county in the 2020 Ulster Championship Semi-Final in a loss against Donegal.

He does firework production.

References 

Year of birth missing (living people)
Living people
Armagh inter-county Gaelic footballers
Crossmaglen Rangers Gaelic footballers
Gaelic footballers who switched code